Chéraga ( ash-Shirāqa) is a suburb of the city of Algiers in northern Algeria.

The indoor sporting arena La Coupole d’Alger Arena is located here.

Notable people

Suburbs of Algiers
Communes of Algiers Province